The 2008 Thomas & Uber Cups Preliminaries for Africa were held in Rose Hill, Mauritius, between 17–21 February and  organised by Mauritius Badminton Association. Kenya was scheduled to host the events, but domestic unrest has led to them being moved to Mauritius. South Africa was the defending champion in men's and women's team events. This tournament serves as qualification stage for African countries for the 2008 Thomas & Uber Cup.

Medalists

Men's Team

Women's Team

See also 
 2008 Thomas & Uber Cup qualification

References

External links 
 Qualifikationsturniere für die Endrunden Thomas-/Uber Cup 2008 (in Germany)

Africa Continental Team Badminton Championships
Badminton tournaments in Mauritius
2008 in badminton
February 2008 sports events in Africa